La Trappe may refer to:

La Trappe Abbey, a Trappist monastery in Soligny-la-Trappe, France
a brand of Trappist beers brewed by De Koningshoeven Brewery